Montague Brown (22 April 1913 – 31 December 1976) was an Australian rules footballer who played with Carlton in the Victorian Football League (VFL).

He was captain of the Carlton Reserves team in 1938.

At the start of the 1939 season Brown was given a clearance to the Camberwell, the next year he was cleared to Bacchus Marsh, then in 1945 he was cleared to Echuca. While at Bacchus Marsh, Brown was a signaller for the Volunteer Defence Corps during World War II. His service number was V361361.

Notes

External links 

Monty Brown's profile at Blueseum

Carlton Football Club players
Camberwell Football Club players
Australian rules footballers from Victoria (Australia)
1913 births
1976 deaths
Volunteer Defence Corps soldiers